Trox zoufali is a species of hide beetle in the subfamily Troginae. Within the genus Trox, it is placed in the subgenus Niditrox.

References

zoufali
Beetles described in 1931